The Best Sports Movie ESPY Award was an annual award honoring the achievements of an individual from the world of sports film making. It was first awarded as part of the ESPY Awards in 2002, and was discontinued nine years later. The Best Sports Movie ESPY Award trophy, designed by sculptor Lawrence Nowlan, was bestowed annually to the sports film adjudged to be the best in a given calendar year. From 2004 onward, the winner was chosen by online voting through choices selected by the ESPN Select Nominating Committee. Before that, determination of the winners was made by an panel of experts. Through the 2001 iteration of the ESPY Awards, ceremonies were conducted in February of each year to honor achievements over the previous calendar year; awards presented thereafter are conferred in July and reflect performance from the June previous.

The inaugural winner of the Best Sports Movie ESPY Award in 2002 was the baseball themed film The Rookie released the same year. It is based on the true story of Jim Morris' minor but notable Major League Baseball career. Films that predominantly feature American football have received the award more than any other sport, with three wins and six further nominations, followed by baseball and basketball with two victories apiece, and were nominated twice. John Lee Hancock is the director who holds more victories than any one else, one for The Rookie, and a second for The Blind Side (2010). The two sports with the most nominations that did not win the award are golf and horse racing, with three each. The final winner of the Best Sports Movie ESPY Award in 2011 was the Boxing film The Fighter, which centers on the lives of former professional boxers Micky Ward and Dicky Eklund, and the issues they are confronted with in both their personal and professional lives.

Winners

See also
List of film awards

Notes and references

Notes

References

External links

ESPY Awards
American film awards
Sports film awards